Petrotettix is a genus of cave wētā in the family Rhaphidophoridae, endemic to New Zealand.

Species 
 Petrotettix cupolensis Richards, 1972 
 Petrotettix nigripes Richards, 1972 
 Petrotettix serratus Richards, 1972 
 Petrotettix spinosus Richards, 1972

References 

 Peripatus

Ensifera genera
Cave weta